Big Bad Beetleborgs (later Beetleborgs Metallix) is an American live-action television series by Saban Entertainment and was co-produced with Renaissance-Atlantic Films, Toei Company and Bugboy Productions. It originally aired on Fox Kids. It premiered on September 7, 1996 and ended on March 2, 1998, with a total of 88 episodes over the course of 2 seasons.

Series overview

Episodes

Season 1 (1996–97): Big Bad Beetleborgs

Season 2 (1997–98): Beetleborgs Metallix

References

Beetleborgs
Big Bad Beetleborgs